Streetlights is the sixth studio album by  American rapper Kurupt, it was released on April 20, 2010.

Background
Kurupt worked with a number of artists for Streetlights, including: Xzibit, Snoop Dogg, Soopafly, Terrace Martin, DJ Quik, Daz Dillinger, Problem.
The album features production from Terrace Martin, DJ Quik, Lil Jon and Pete Rock. Chris Ayears and John D. Ahn both received A&R credit for the album.

Commercial reception
The album debuted at number one-hundred and eighty-three on April 28 selling 2,900 copies in its first week of release.

Singles
"I'm Burnt" is the first single. It was released on December 19, 2009 featuring Problem and is produced by Terrence Martin. A video has been shot and was released on December 21, 2009. The single also contains a sample of Eazy-E's 1988 hit single, "Boyz-n-the-Hood".
"In Gotti We Trust" is the second single. It was released on April 2, 2010. the video was shot on March 28, 2010 it is produced by Terrace Martin and features rapper Xzibit.
"Questions" is the third single. It was released with the video on May 4, 2010 and is produced by Terrace Martin it and features Uncle Chucc.
"Yessir" is the fourth single produced by Pete Rock. It was released on June 18, 2010.

Track listing

Chart positions

References

External links
Kurupt, "Streetlights" by Billboard

2010 albums
Kurupt albums
Albums produced by Terrace Martin
Albums produced by Pete Rock
Albums produced by Lil Jon
Albums produced by DJ Quik
Albums produced by Mars (record producer)